The Namibian ambassador in Washington, D.C. is the official representative of the Government in Windhoek to the government of the United States. The two countries established diplomatic relations on 21 March 1990, the day of independence of Namibia.

List of representatives

References 

 
United States
Namibia